Catchment Management Authorities were responsible for the management of water catchments in the state of New South Wales, Australia until 2013.

 Border Rivers-Gwydir Catchment Management Authority
 Central West Catchment Management Authority
 Hawkesbury-Nepean Catchment Management Authority
 Hunter-Central Rivers Catchment Management Authority
 Lachlan Catchment Management Authority
 Lower Murray Darling Catchment Management Authority
 Murray Catchment Management Authority
 Murrumbidgee Catchment Management Authority
 Namoi Catchment Management Authority
 Northern Rivers Catchment Management Authority
 Southern Rivers Catchment Management Authority
 Sydney Catchment Authority
 Sydney Metropolitan Catchment Management Authority
 Western Catchment Management Authority

From January 2014, the NSW Government established Local Land Services to replace the CMAs. The eleven Local Land Services Regions are established within the NSW Primary Industries portfolio.

From 10 March 2014, the Sydney Catchment Authority was absorbed into WaterNSW

References

Water management in New South Wales
Government agencies of New South Wales